Tatar (also Romanized as Tātār) is a village in Chaybasar-e Jonubi Rural District, in the Central District of Maku County, West Azerbaijan Province, Iran. At the 2006 census, its population was 38, in 7 families.

References 

Populated places in Maku County